The Shenendehowa Central School District, often shortened to Shen, is a public school district located in New York's Capital District.  The district's  main campus is located off NY 146 in Clifton Park, and is home to eight of the district's 12 schools, in five buildings. The remaining four schools are called "neighborhood elementary schools" and are located throughout the district in three buildings. The district serves approximately 9,800 students in grades K-12 from throughout its  territory which includes the towns of Clifton Park, Halfmoon, Ballston Lake, Round Lake, Malta and parts of Waterford, Rexford, Mechanicville and Stillwater.  Shenendehowa is the largest School District in Saratoga County, and the largest in student population in the Suburban Council, an interscholastic athletic consortium of 11 area school with a districts.

Schools
Today, Shenendehowa is a district of 13 schools: 8 elementary schools, 3 middle schools, and 2 high schools.

Elementary schools
Four elementary schools are located on the main campus (Skano, Tesago, Orenda, and Karigon). The other four are neighborhood elementary schools including Okte, located on CR-92 Crescent Road off Exit 8 of the Adirondack Northway (I-87); Chango, located off CR-80 Round Lake Road at Exit 11 of the Adirondack Northway (I-87); and Arongen and Shatekon, both located just off the main campus.
These schools are for students in grades K-5, with AM and PM kindergartens.

Principals
Andrew Hills - Arongen
Michelle Rawson - Chango
Malik Jones - Karigon
Kathleen Strangis - Okte
Todd Giagni - Orenda
Erica J. Ryan - Shatekon
Jill Florio - Skano
Gregory Pace - Tesago

Middle schools
The district's three middle school buildings share one large complex on the main campus. The schools share areas such as gyms and libraries, but function as separate schools. One section of the middle school complex is the oldest building on campus, but has undergone extensive renovations and reconfigurations over the 63 years since it was built. The building now is home to Acadia, Koda, and Gowana Middle Schools, which together house all students in grades 6 through 8, divided by geographical region. Koda is the newest school and opened in 1999.

Principals
Jonathan Burns - Acadia
Robin Gawrys - Gowana
Sean Gnat - Koda

Shenendehowa High School

Shenendehowa High School is divided into two buildings, designated East and West by their respective geographical locations on the district's main campus. The West Building houses Grade 9, while the East Building houses Grades 10-12 Since the opening of the new wing of the East building in September 2004, that building has housed all of the district's sophomores, juniors, and seniors, while the West building has housed only the district's freshmen. The current principal is Ron Agostini.

District governance

Board of education
At the district level, Shenendehowa is governed by a Board of Education made up of seven unsalaried citizens who serve three-year terms, and who are elected on a rotating basis.
The current members of the board of education are:

Naomi Hoffman- President
Jason Digianni- Vice President
Petra Holden
Gusta Miller 
Stacey Pfolmm
Deanna Stephenson  
Thomas Templeton

Superintendent
The board of education also employs a district superintendent who oversees the day-to-day operation of the district and who is responsible for the administration of board policies. The current superintendent is Dr L. Oliver Robinson, who received his bachelor's degree from Brown University and his master's degree and doctorate from SUNY Albany. He was previously the superintendent of Mohonasen Central School District, and received The Business Review's Best and Brightest Under 40 Award in 2004.

Past superintendents include:
John O'Rourke (interim superintendent 2005)
Dr. Robert McClure (1998-2005)
Dr. Richard O'Rourke (interim superintendent 1997-1998)
John Yagielski (1992-1997)
Edward McHale (1985-1992)
Dr. Edwin Dunmire (1968-1985)
Richard Zeller (1968)
Charles Fryer (1961-1968)	
Rodney Winans (1950-1961)

District statistics
In the 2005-06 school year, 4463 students were enrolled in grades K-5, 2269 were enrolled in grades 6-8, and 2858 were enrolled in grades 9-12. The district employed 676 teachers, 12 principals, 10 assistant principals, 85 professional staff, and 36 paraprofessionals during the same school year.

In the 2012-13 school year, a total of 8,745 students were enrolled in the district at the end of the year. The district employed 662 teachers, 12 principals, 11 assistant principals, and 85 professional staff.

History
Shenendehowa Central School district was established on January 14, 1950, under the name of "Central Schools District No. 2, of the Towns of Clifton Park, Halfmoon, Malta, Waterford, Ballston and Stillwater, County of Saratoga, New York."  The name Shenendehowa was decided later and accredited to old Dutch maps which designated the area as such. The school board says the word "Shenendahowe" comes from an Iroquois word meaning "Great Plains".
All of the schools, with the exception of the high schools, have names derived from the Iroquois language.

After construction, kindergarten students and students of grades 8 through 12 were allowed to move into the main building (now Gowana and Acadia) in 1953. The following year, students of grades 1 through 7 would enter the same building. Grades K-6 moved to Tesago and Skano in 1966, while grades 9-12 moved to Shenendehowa High School after it was built in 1970. Shenendehowa Central School District continued to expand with Orenda  and Karigon (1968); Okte (1973); Chango (1974); Koda Middle School (1976) (now High School West); Arongen (1992); High School West (1999); and Shatekon (2007).

Alma Mater
Shenendehowa's alma mater, written in 1962, is as follows:Shenendehowa Central out on the plain so clear; Her Carillon bells are standing a symbol we hold dear; And through the years she'll guide us and help us on our way; We never will forget her but with honour will repay; Alma Mater, Alma Mater; to thee we sang our praise; Shenendehowa Central; Our standard our guide always

Athletic teams
Shenendehowa's athletic teams are called the Plainsmen, and their mascot is the stallion. Until 1995, the district used two different caricatures of a Native American as a mascot; they were phased out due to concerns that it depicted Native Americans in a demeaning and prejudicial fashion. The Plainsmen participate in 34 varsity sports over all seasons, as well as competing at junior varsity, freshman, and modified levels in many of these sports. Fall varsity sports include boys' cross country, American football, golf, soccer, and volleyball, as well as girls' cross country running, field hockey, soccer, swimming and diving, tennis, volleyball, color guard, and cheerleading. In the winter season, the Plainsmen compete in boys' and girls' alpine and cross-country skiing, basketball, bowling club, winter guard, and indoor track, as well as boys' wrestling, swimming and diving, and ice hockey, and girls' gymnastics and cheerleading. The spring season includes boys' and girls' track and field and lacrosse, as well as baseball and tennis for boys, and softball for girls.

Although not officially associated with Shenendehowa athletics, Friends of Shenendehowa Crew, Inc. sponsors crew teams at the modified, freshmen, and varsity levels which are open to Shenendehowa students.)

See also
 Shenendehowa High School
 List of school districts in New York

References

External links
 

School districts in New York (state)
Education in Saratoga County, New York
School districts established in 1950